Alphen Dam is a small dam in the Bonte River near Stellenbosch, Western Cape province of South Africa. It was established in 1990.

See also
List of reservoirs and dams in South Africa
List of rivers of South Africa

References 
 List of South African Dams from the South African Department of Water Affairs

Dams in South Africa
Dams completed in 1990